Cryptanthus lyman-smithii is a plant species in the genus Cryptanthus. This species is endemic to Brazil.

References

lyman-smithii
Flora of Brazil
Plants described in 1999